Li Ruiqing (李瑞清; 1867–1920), was a Chinese artist, calligrapher and educator. He is also known by the style name Meian. He was a pioneering influential educator in China's modern history, the founder of China's modern art education.

Li Ruiqing was appointed the president of Liang Jiang Higher Normal School (Nanjing University) in 1906. He reformed scholastic instruction, and established the Faculty of Drawing & Handcraft at the school. He also started art education in Chinese modern institutions of higher learning.

Li Ruiqing is the originator of Jinshi Calligraphy School (金石書派, Jin Shi Shu Pai).

References

Educators from Jiangxi
Chinese scholars
Presidents of Nanjing University
1867 births
1920 deaths
Qing dynasty painters
Republic of China painters
People from Fuzhou, Jiangxi
Painters from Jiangxi
Qing dynasty calligraphers
Republic of China calligraphers